The Temple of Piety was a sanctuary in Ancient Rome dedicated to the goddess Pietas. The temple was founded in 191 BC and torn down in 44 BC.

See also
List of Ancient Roman temples

References

Piety
Roman temples by deity
2nd-century BC religious buildings and structures
Destroyed temples